Munger University is a state university and was established on 18 March 2018 through bifurcation of Tilka Manjhi Bhagalpur University, Bhagalpur. The university started operating academically from the 2018–19 academic year.

History
Munger University came into existence on 18 March 2018 under the Bihar State Universities (Amendment) Act, 2016 (Bihar Act – 1/2017).

Bills pertaining to the creation of Munger, Purnia and Patliputra University were passed by the State Legislature in 2016, and official Gazette for the same were published subsequently. The formation of the university was notified in March 2018 in accordance with the Government pronouncement in the Gazette.

Campus
The university is currently operating from RD & DJ College, Munger campus spread over 25 acres of land near New Police Headquarter Munger.

Administration

The vice chancellor is Shyama Roy and the registrar is Dr. C.K Mishra .

Organisation

Colleges 
It has jurisdiction spreading over all five districts of the Munger division.

There are 17 constituent colleges, 12 affiliated colleges, 5 single faculty education colleges (Affiliated B. Ed. Colleges) and one affiliated law college in the Munger University.

Affiliated colleges 
Bishwanath Singh Institute of Legal Studies
C N B College Hathiama, Sheikhpura
Dhanraj Singh College Sikandra, Jamui
International College Ghosaith, Lakhisarai
M S College Alouli, Sonihar, Khagaria
Mahila Mahavidyalaya Barhiya, Lakhisarai
P P Yadav College Chakai, Jamui
R Lal College Lakhisarai
Sanjay Gandhi Mahila College Sheikhpura
Shyama Prasad Mahila College Jamui
S A Eklavya Degree College Jamui
S B N College Garhi Rampur, Munger
S K College Lohanda, Jamui
S S College, Mehus Sheikhpura

Constituent colleges 
B.N.M. College, Barhiya, Lakhisarai
B.R.M. College, Munger
D.S.M. College, Jhajha, Jamui
H.S. College, Haveli Kharagpur, Munger
J.M.S. College, Munger
J.R.S. College, Jamalpur
Jamalpur College, Jamalpur
Koshi College, Khagaria
K.D. College, Gogri Jamalpur, Khagaria
K.K.M. College, Jamui
K.M.D. College, Parbatta, Khagaria
K.S.S. College, Lakhisarai
Mahila College, Khagaria
R.D. College, Sheikhpura
RD & DJ College, Munger
R.S. College, Tarapur, Munger
S.K.R. College, Barbigha, Sheikhpura
R. lal college lakhisarai

Academic programmes
The programmes offered at the university are identical to the ones being offered at Tilka Manjhi Bhagalpur University.

References

Universities in Bihar
Education in Munger district
Educational institutions established in 2018
2018 establishments in Bihar
Munger University